Ernest McLean is a Canadian former politician in the province of Newfoundland and Labrador. He represented the electoral district of Lake Melville in the Newfoundland and Labrador House of Assembly from 1996 to 2003, as a member of the Liberal Party of Newfoundland and Labrador. He served as Minister of Government Services and Lands, and Minister Responsible for Labrador in the cabinet of Brian Tobin and as Minister of Development and Rural Renewal in the cabinet of premier Roger Grimes.

McLean was born at North West River, Labrador and attended Yale High School graduating in 1963. Before entering politics, he worked for the Grenfell Regional Health Services and Department of Municipal and Provincial Affairs. McLean also served as mayor of his hometown, North West River. Following his retirement from provincial politics, he served once again as deputy mayor of North West River in 2008. McLean also served in various community positions including as Director of the Labrador North Chamber of Commerce, treasurer and president of the Labrador Heritage Society and on the Labrador Health Board.

References

Living people
1940s births
Liberal Party of Newfoundland and Labrador MHAs
20th-century Canadian politicians
21st-century Canadian politicians